Olybria furciferella is a species of snout moth in the genus Olybria. It was described by Harrison Gray Dyar Jr. in 1904 and is known from the US states of Arizona, Nevada and Texas.

References

Moths described in 1904
Phycitinae